Ecnomiohyla phantasmagoria is a species of frog in the family Hylidae.
It is found in Colombia and Ecuador.
Its natural habitat is subtropical or tropical moist lowland forests.
It is threatened by habitat loss.

References

Ecnomiohyla
Amphibians of Colombia
Amphibians of Venezuela
Amphibians described in 1943
Taxonomy articles created by Polbot